The ischiocavernosus muscle (erectores penis or erector clitoridis in older texts) is a muscle just below the surface of the perineum, present in both men and women.

Structure
It arises by tendinous and fleshy fibers from the inner surface of the tuberosity of the ischium, behind the crus penis; and from the inferior pubic rami and ischium on either side of the crus.

From these points fleshy fibers succeed, and end in an aponeurosis which is inserted into the sides and under surface of the crus penis.

Function
In females, the ischiocavernosus muscle assists with clitoral erection. In males, it helps to stabilize the erect penis by compressing the crus penis and retarding the return of blood through the veins.

Additional images

References

External links
  - "The Female Perineum: Muscles of the Superficial Perineal Pouch"
  - "Muscles of the female superficial perineal pouch."
  - "Muscles of the male superficial perineal pouch. "

Muscles of the torso
Perineum